Ernesto Rayper (1 November 1840, Genoa - 5 August 1873, Stella) was an Italian painter and engraver.

Biography
In 1859, after receiving his basic education at a Piarist school and the Collegio dei Tolomei in Siena, he enrolled in courses at the Accademia Ligustica di Belle Arti and took lessons from Tammar Luxoro. Under his influence, he decided to specialize in landscapes. During 1860, he spent some time in Geneva at the workshops of Alexandre Calame.

Upon returning to Genoa, he strove to develop his own style, distinct from the current Romantic and Academic trends. He had his first exhibit at the Society for the Promotion of Fine Arts in 1862. The following year, he began promoting the concept of plein aire painting and the Scuola grigia, so-named for Rayper's avoidance of the color black, took shape. Later, he began working with a group of artists from Canavese, led by Carlo Pittara.

In 1870 he was named a "Professor of Merit" at the Accademia Ligustica and won a gold medal at the "Esposizione Nazionale di Parma".

The following year, he developed a cancerous tumor on his tongue. After travelling throughout Italy, seeking an effective treatment, he retired to a small town in Savona and died there, aged only thirty-three.

After his death, his work became somewhat neglected until 1926, when a major exhibition was held at the Teatro Carlo Felice. Further exhibitions were held in 1938 at the Palazzo Rosso and in 1974, at his alma mater, the Accademia Ligustica; sponsored by the City of Genoa.

References

Further reading
Vitaliano Rocchiero, "Ottocento pittorico genovese - Ernesto Rayper", in the Rivista Liguria, Feb.1956
Vitaliano Rocchiero, Rayper e Musso protagonisti della scuola grigia e comprimari del paesaggismo italiano, (exhibition catalog) Galleria Liguria, 1969
Gianfranco Bruno, Ernesto Rayper, Arti Grafiche Giuseppe Lang, 1972

External links

Arcadja Auctions: More works by Rayper.

1840 births
1873 deaths
Painters from Genoa
19th-century Italian painters
Italian male painters
Italian landscape painters
Deaths from oral cancer
Accademia Ligustica di Belle Arti alumni
19th-century Italian male artists